The Clarksville Elementary School in Clarksville, New York, also known as Clarksville Grade School, is a Modern Movement-style building built in 1949. The design by Henry L. Blatner. Harry Blatner was an architectural success that was featured in nationwide publications and led to much change in how schools were designed.  The application of bilateral lighting was one innovation.  The school was closed after the 2010–11 school year. It is currently home to the Albany County Sheriff's Uniform Patrol Division.

It was listed on the U.S. National Register of Historic Places in 2008.

References

School buildings on the National Register of Historic Places in New York (state)
School buildings completed in 1949
Schools in Albany County, New York
National Register of Historic Places in Albany County, New York